San Juan Petlapa is a town and municipality in Oaxaca in south-western Mexico. The municipality covers an area of 253.89 km².  
It is part of the Choapam District in the south of the Papaloapan Region.

As of 2005, the municipality had a total population of 2717. Among the population, 773 are Indigenous people.

References

Municipalities of Oaxaca